Upper Sandusky High School is a public high school in Upper Sandusky, Ohio. It is the only high school in the Upper Sandusky Exempted Village School District. Their nickname is the Rams.

Team State champions

 Boys basketball – 2005 
 Girls track and field – 2000, 2001

Athletic league affiliations
Northern Ohio League: 1944-2011
North Central Conference: 2011-2014
Mid-Ohio Athletic Conference: Football-only, fall 2014
Northern 10 Athletic Conference: 2014- (football joined in 2015)

Notable alumni

 Jon Diebler (born 1988), basketball player in the Israel Basketball Premier League

References

External links
  District Website

High schools in Wyandot County, Ohio
Public high schools in Ohio